Granicus may refer to:
 Granicus River, also called Biga River (Turkish: Biga Çayı)
 Battle of the Granicus River, between Alexander the Great and the Persian Empire in May 334 BC
 Granicus (band), a band formed in 1969
 Granicus Valles, a network of valleys on Mars